Africa and Diaspora Public Television (ADPUT) Screening Conference is Africa's version of INPUT. It is modeled on the same international public television organization that is dedicated to television as public service and in the public interest, yet ADPUT focuses on Africa's own specific public broadcast challenges.

History
PBS throughout Africa does not have support mechanisms to help it keep up with the technological developments that are influencing and changing viewing patterns and trends, AD-PUT is intended as a forum to help safeguard principles of television in the public interest and defend the democratic heritage of public participation within the public broadcast service whilst keeping up with technological changes. The initiative is based on Decision 69 of the Assembly of the African Union, Second Ordinary Session 2003, as well as declarations of the "Global Diaspora Summit" of Heads of States of the African Union Diaspora/Assembly/AU/Decl/(I). In consideration of the power of PBS to reach even the lower income groups, the decision to model AD-PUT on the International Public Television Screening Conference (INPUT) format of screening conferences and workshops was regarded as the best way to address the Africa specific television experiences of Public Broadcast Service problems directly. This was also meant to address the fact that African representation at every edition of INPUT-TV.org has been close to zero, including the two instances hosted in South Africa.

References

Television in Africa
Television organizations
Organizations established in 2003